Alexander Owens is an Irish judge who has been a judge of the High Court since February 2019. He formerly worked as a barrister with an expertise in criminal law.

Education 
Owens attended Trinity College Dublin where he obtained a BA. He studied to become a barrister at the King's Inns.

Legal career 
He was called to the Bar in 1980 and became a senior counsel in 2000. His practice focused on criminal law, and the law of conveyancing, local government and chancery law. He also appeared in cases involving company law and personal injuries.

He frequently appeared on behalf of the Director of Public Prosecutions. He prosecuted criminal trials of a serious nature involving sexual offences, kidnapping, murder, waste offences, and terrorism offences. He appeared for the Minister for Justice in an action relating to the publication of the Cloyne Report.

He was appointed Deputy Chairman of the Panel of Enquiry of the University of Dublin in 2004 and subsequently became the chair.

Judicial career 
Owens was appointed a judge of the High Court in February 2019. He has presided over cases involving extradition, sexual offences, murder, manslaughter, false imprisonment, and the proceeds of crime. Outside of criminal law he has heard cases involving child law, property, and personal injury law.

He became a judge of the Special Criminal Court in July 2019, replacing Aileen Donnelly. He has acted as the presiding judge in that court.

References 

Living people
High Court judges (Ireland)
Irish barristers
Alumni of Trinity College Dublin
Alumni of King's Inns
Year of birth missing (living people)